Gunther Belitz is a paralympic athlete from Germany competing mainly in category F42 high and long jump events. He is also editor of the German magazine Handicap.

Biography
Belitz has competed in four Paralympics, his first in 1988 he competed in just the long jump.  Four years later in the 1992 Summer Paralympics he competed in the high jump and 4 × 100 m relay as well as winning the bronze medal in the TS1 100m and a gold in the J1 long jump.  In the 1996 Summer Paralympics he competed in the 100m and high jump and won a silver medal in the long jump.  His last appearance in a Paralympics was in 2000 where he competed in the long and high jump, this time winning a bronze medal in the F42 high jump.

References

Paralympic athletes of Germany
Athletes (track and field) at the 1992 Summer Paralympics
Athletes (track and field) at the 1996 Summer Paralympics
Athletes (track and field) at the 2000 Summer Paralympics
Paralympic gold medalists for Germany
Paralympic silver medalists for Germany
Paralympic bronze medalists for Germany
Living people
Medalists at the 1992 Summer Paralympics
Medalists at the 1996 Summer Paralympics
Medalists at the 2000 Summer Paralympics
Year of birth missing (living people)
Paralympic medalists in athletics (track and field)
German male sprinters
German male long jumpers
German male high jumpers
Sprinters with limb difference
Long jumpers with limb difference
High jumpers with limb difference